The Giltner team was a minor league baseball team based in Giltner, Nebraska. In 1903, the Giltner team played as members of the Independent level Central Nebraska League, with no given nickname, common in the era.

History
In 1903, Giltner, Nebraska first fielded a minor league team, when the Giltner team played as charter members of the short–lived Central Nebraska League, an Independent level league.

The five charter members of the 1903 Central Nebraska League included Giltner,who were joined by the Holdrege Silver Ashes, McCook, Minden and  Red Cloud  The Giltner team was without a known moniker, as was common in the era.

On July 1, 1903, according to local newspaper reports, Giltner defeated Minden by a score 6–0. On July 2, 1903, it was reported Giltner again defeated Minden by a score of 7–3.

Minden reportedly defeated Giltner by a score of 9–6 on Friday July 17, 1903.

The exact team records and standings of the 1903 Central Nebraska League are unknown. The last known standings were published on July 24, 1903, shortly before the Giltner and Minden teams both disbanded. The July 24 standings showed Giltner with a record of 9–18 and in 3rd place, 9.5 games behind 1st place Holdrege. The Red Cloud and McCook teams disbanded shortly thereafter, leaving only Holdrege, who finished the season as a traveling team. 

The Central Nebraska League permanently folded after the 1903 season. Giltner, Nebraska has not hosted another minor league team.

The ballpark
The name of the 1903 Giltner home ballpark is not directly referenced.

Yea–-by–year record

Notable alumni
No alumni of the 1903 Giltner team advanced to the major leagues.

References

External link
Baseball Reference

Baseball teams established in 1903
Defunct minor league baseball teams
Defunct baseball teams in Nebraska
Professional baseball teams in Nebraska
Baseball teams disestablished in 1903
Central Nebraska League teams
Hamilton County, Nebraska